Danko Lazović (born 17 May 1983) is a Serbian former footballer who played as a forward or winger. He represented the Serbia national team at the 2010 FIFA World Cup.

Club career

Partizan
Lazović started playing football at a small football school in Kragujevac, before joining Partizan at the age of 13. In his first senior season, Lazović made eight league appearances for Partizan, and also played for Teleoptik on loan. Lazović made his European debut in the UEFA Cup qualifiers against Santa Coloma on 23 August 2001. He won the domestic title with Partizan twice in a row, in 2001–02 and 2002–03.

Feyenoord
After an impressive form at Partizan, Lazović would join Feyenoord in the summer of 2003 for a club record €7 million. On the opening of the season on 17 October 2003, he scored on his debut and the club's first goal of the season, in a 2–1 win over NEC and scored his first brace in his Feyenoord's career in a 3–2 win over Utrecht on 25 January 2004, bringing his 15 games without scoring. At the last game of the season, Lazović scored his first hat-trick in his Feyenoord's career, in a 7–1 win over relegated side PEC Zwolle. The next season, Lazović scored his first goal of the season and would score another, also setting up a goal for Dirk Kuyt in a 7–2 win over De Graafschap. At his time at the club, however, Lazović found it difficult to break into the first team squad at Feyenoord and moved onto Bayer Leverkusen in the summer of 2005 on a loan deal. After the move, Lazović said he expected to resurrect his career. In the first round of DFB-Pokal, Lazović scored a hat-trick on his competitive debut in an 8–0 win over Rot-Weiß Erfurt. However, he also failed to settle in at Bayer Leverkusen, returning to Partizan in January 2006 on a six-month loan deal. He had a decent half-season at his old club, scoring five league goals, but various reports continued about his apparent disruptive dressing room influence. In early May 2006, after the last league match of the season, Lazović was reportedly involved in a training ground bust up with teammate Niša Saveljić with bad blood even continuing later during lunch at the training facility.

Vitesse
Over the summer of 2006, Lazović returned to the Eredivisie, this time with Vitesse. Vitesse paid Feyenoord €1.5 million for the forward, with Feyenoord agreeing to pay the first year of his salary. On the opening game of the season, Lazović scored on his debut in a 2–1 win over Sparta Rotterdam (which he scored against them once again but a brace in a 3–0 win on 6 April 2006) and scored the following week (on 26 August 2006) in a 3–1 over AZ. Lazović scored his first hat-trick in the Dutch league in over two years in a 4–0 win over Heracles Almelo on 23 September 2006. He scored a goal and set up a goal for Anduele Pryor in a 2–2 draw but received a straight red card, just minutes before half-time, against Excelsior on 28 October 2006. Lazović was a member of the squad that beat Ajax 4–2, as he scored for himself and set up two goals for Mads Junker and Youssouf Hersi respectively. To the dismay of many Feyenoord fans, Lazović had an excellent season at Vitesse, rediscovering his scoring touch and being a serious contender for the league's golden boot for most of the season. He was also the club's top scorer.

PSV

Lazović attracted the attention of PSV early on, before moving to them at the end of the season for €6.6 million, signing a five-year deal. He took over the number 9 jersey from legendary forward Patrick Kluivert, who was released and joined Lille. At PSV, Lazović earned the nickname "Lazoflap" due to his moderate appearance.

On the opening game of the season, Lazović scored twice on his debut in a 5–0 win over NEC. In the opening game of the UEFA Champions League group stage, he scored in a 2–1 win over CSKA Moscow. PSV's campaign in the Champions League went poor, resulting in the club going to the UEFA Cup. In the third round of UEFA Cup, he scored and set up a goal for Timmy Simons in a 2–0 win over Helsingborgs IF in the first leg. In the second leg, he scored again with the same result as in the first round. The club would progress in the UEFA Cup until meeting Italian side Fiorentina at the quarter final. At the end of the season, the club would win the title after scoring against his former club Vitesse in a 1–0 win.

The following season, Lazović scored his first two goals of the season as PSV would beat De Graafschap 3–0. In November 2008, he would be involved in a conflict with manager Huub Stevens. After setting up a goal for Ibrahim Afellay against Ajax, he appeared to allegedly insult Stevens, and after the match (which PSV lost 4–1) he was fined for showing dissent. Eventually, he would apologize and the two would bury the hatchet. On the last match of the Champions League group stage, he scored the club's only goal in the match as PSV lost 3–1 against Liverpool. Later in the season, however, the club could not win another title and surrendered it to AZ.

The following season, he scored his first goal of the season in a 3–1 win over Willem II on 26 September 2009. On 11 November 2009, he earned a hat-trick and set up goals for Ola Toivonen (twice) and Otman Bakkal in a 5–1 win over ADO Den Haag. On 6 December 2009, he scored his last goal for the club in a 2–0 win over RKC Waalwijk, having previously scored against Sparta the previous week in a 3–2 win and ten days, he also scored his last competitive goal in a 2–0 win over CFR Cluj. He would make his last league appearance in a 1–1 draw against Sparta and also his last competitive appearance in the Europa League in a 3–2 win over Hamburger SV in the second leg, assisting a brace for Toivonen and Danny Koevermans. PSV, however, was eliminated in the Europa League on away goals.

Zenit Saint Petersburg

On 3 March 2010, Zenit Saint Petersburg completed the transfer of the striker from PSV for nearly €5 million. After the deal, PSV general director Jan Reker said, "Danko Lazović told us about the interest of Zenit about a week ago. We've since discussed his situation several times and have eventually decided to cash in on him."

Lazović made his Russian Premier League debut for Zenit on 13 March 2010 against Krylia Sovetov Samara, coming on as a substitute in the 54th minute for Konstantin Zyryanov. Two weeks later, Lazović made his first impact on the scoresheet, delivering a perfect ball to set up Danny for the first goal against Dynamo Moscow. His first goal, however, did not come until 9 July 2010 against Alania Vladikavkaz, as he helped Zenit to a 3–1 away victory.

On 30 September 2010, Lazović scored a double against AEK Athens in the Europa League at the Petrovsky Stadium. He scored from the penalty spot in the 43rd minute, beating AEK goalkeeper Giannis Arabatzis then added his second in the 57th minute, poking home a cross from Vladimir Bystrov. On 14 November 2010, he scored the Championship-winning goal against Rostov in the 40th minute, helping Zenit win its second Russian Premier League title in four years. Lazović finished the season with five goals in the Russian Premier League and seven in total. He tied with Georgi Peev of Amkar Perm for second-best assistant in the RPL with seven assists.

On 19 June 2011, during a 2–0 win over Volga, Lazović made headlines when he was tasered by the police with an electric baton after he tried to throw his shirt into the stands, that left a burn mark under his right shoulder blade. Television footage shows the Lazović (with no shirt) being approached by police officers as he moved towards the away fans after the match. Afterwards, he was quoted by Sport Express newspaper as saying, "I simply went to give my shirt to the fans after the game when a policeman appeared behind me and hit me in the back with an electric shock, I don't know why this happened. Maybe he thought I was one of the fans." Because of the police action, the club would make the accusation to the police, which they deny wrongdoing. Andrei Shmonin, deputy police chief of public security police in Nizhny Novgorod, says the police stepped between the players and the fans, with arms outstretched. In his hands was a stun gun, but it was not used. There was evidence by the medical commission, that Lazović did receive an electric shock from the police and also said the diagnosis that Lazović received was electrical accident and first-degree burns on the right subscapular region. Later in his Zenit's career, he was among three other player to be left out of the squad to the training camp in Zenit's first pre-season training camp. Also, Lazović first team opportunities would soon be limited due to goalscoring form striker Aleksandr Kerzhakov and several new signing, leading him to be placed in the reserves.

Upon his return to Zenit, Lazović continued to remain out of the first team spotlight, as he trains separate from the first team. He was linked with PAOK and Legia Warsaw In November 2013, Lazović announced he will leave the club at the end of the season.

On 27 February 2013, just one day before the Russian transfer deadline, it was announced that he joined the Russian Premier League side Rostov on loan until the end of the 2012–13 season. In his first appearance of the 2012–13 season, he made his debut for Rostov, playing in the left wing, in a 0–0 draw against Alania Vladikavkaz. At the end of the season, Lazović returned to the club following a loan spell with Rostov.

Partizan
After leaving Zenit Saint Petersburg, Lazović returned to Serbia to rejoin Partizan on a free transfer, signing a two-year deal. On 8 March 2014, Lazović made his official re-debut for the club against his former club, Radnički Kragujevac, and scored a goal from the penalty spot in a 5–0 away win. During the 2013–14 season, Lazović played ten matches and scored six goals.

Lazović played his first match in the 2014–15 season against HB on 15 July 2014, in the second qualifying round of the 2014–15 UEFA Champions League, where he scored a brace and provided an assist in a 3–0 home win. On 31 August 2014, Lazović scored a brace in a 4–0 away league win over Rad. He has ended the first part of the season with 12 goals and 8 assists in 28 appearances in all competitions.

Beijing Enterprises Group
On 16 February 2015, Lazović transferred to China League One side Beijing Enterprises Group.

Olimpija Ljubljana
On 25 February 2016, Lazović transferred to Slovenian PrvaLiga side Olimpija Ljubljana. He left the club on 20 April 2016 without making a single appearance for the club, as he did not obtain a work permit.

Videoton
In June 2016, Lazović was signed by Hungarian club Videoton, playing in the Nemzeti Bajnokság I. While with the team, the veteran scorer played a key part in their in success as the runners-up for the 2016–17 Nemzeti Bajnokság I season and winning the 2017–18 Nemzeti Bajnokság I season as the team's leading scorer. At the beginning of the 2018–19 season he captained them to reach the group stage of the UEFA Europe League but retired before its start in September 2018.

International career

Lazović made his international debut for the Yugoslav national team on 27 March 2002, in a friendly match against Brazil in Fortaleza.

After the Serbia and Montenegro split, Lazović played for Serbia, and scored the first goal ever in international football for Serbia; an equalizer in their friendly against the Czech Republic on 16 August 2006 in Uherské Hradiště, which they went on to win 3–1.

In June 2010, he was selected in Serbia's squad for the 2010 FIFA World Cup,  where he appeared in group stage matches against Germany and Australia.

In March 2011, two weeks before a crucial Euro 2012 qualifier against Northern Ireland, Lazović decided to retire from the national team at the age of 27, choosing to focus on his club Zenit. On the same occasion, his club colleague from Zenit Aleksandar Luković also made the same announcement.

Career statistics

Club

International

Honours
Partizan
 First League of Serbia and Montenegro: 2001–02, 2002–03
 Serbia and Montenegro Cup: 2000–01

PSV
 Eredivisie: 2007–08
 Johan Cruyff Shield: 2008

Zenit Saint Petersburg
 Russian Premier League: 2010, 2011–12
 Russian Cup: 2009–10
 Russian Super Cup: 2011

Videoton
 Nemzeti Bajnokság I: 2017–18

References

External links

 
 
 
 
 

1983 births
Living people
Sportspeople from Kragujevac
Serbian footballers
Association football forwards
Association football wingers
Association football utility players
Serbia and Montenegro under-21 international footballers
Serbia and Montenegro international footballers
Serbia international footballers
FK Teleoptik players
FK Partizan players
Feyenoord players
Bayer 04 Leverkusen players
SBV Vitesse players
PSV Eindhoven players
FC Zenit Saint Petersburg players
FC Rostov players
Eredivisie players
Bundesliga players
Russian Premier League players
Serbian expatriate footballers
Expatriate footballers in the Netherlands
Expatriate footballers in Germany
Expatriate footballers in Russia
2010 FIFA World Cup players
Serbia and Montenegro expatriate footballers
Serbia and Montenegro footballers
Serbia and Montenegro expatriate sportspeople in the Netherlands
Serbian expatriate sportspeople in Germany
Serbian expatriate sportspeople in Russia
Expatriate footballers in China
China League One players
Beijing Sport University F.C. players
Serbian expatriate sportspeople in Slovenia
Expatriate footballers in Slovenia
Serbian expatriate sportspeople in Hungary
Expatriate footballers in Hungary
NK Olimpija Ljubljana (2005) players
Fehérvár FC players
Nemzeti Bajnokság I players